Josef Pick (born 11 November 1958) is a Czech volleyball player. He competed in the men's tournament at the 1980 Summer Olympics.

References

1958 births
Living people
Czech men's volleyball players
Olympic volleyball players of Czechoslovakia
Volleyball players at the 1980 Summer Olympics
Place of birth missing (living people)